Jae-chul Shin (20 December 1936 – 9 July 2012) was a Korean martial artist and founder of the World Tang Soo Do Association.

Biography 
Jae-chul Shin began his study of martial arts in 1948 joining the Seoul Moo Duk Kwan Central Gym studying under Grandmaster Hwang Kee, the founder of the Korean Moo Duk Kwan system. By the time he was a first dan black belt, he had already started his teaching career as an assistant instructor at the central gym.

Shin would continue to study Tang Soo Do while attending Korea University, where he would earn both his bachelor's and master's degrees in political science. While studying at Korea University, Shin began teaching at the university, along at the Seoul Central YMCA, various colleges, and many police and military institutions.

In 1958, Shin was drafted into the South Korean air force as a martial arts instructor. While in the air force he was stationed at Osan Air Base, teaching Tang Soo Do to both American and Korean servicemen. One of those servicemen that Shin taught was an American named Carlos Ray “Chuck” Norris.

By the time he had completed his master's degree in 1968, Shin had been instructing students in Tang Soo Do throughout South Korea for almost 20 years. That same year at the request and sponsorship of Chuck Norris, Shin came to the United States to continue graduate studies at Rutgers University and extend his instruction to foreign students as a representative for the Korean Soo Bahk Do Association.

Shin established the U.S. Tang Soo Do Federation in 1968 at his first school in Burlington, New Jersey.  In 1982, dissatisfied with the direction that the U.S. Tang Soo Do Moo Duk Kwan Federation was going, Shin resigned from the federation's board of directors and along with Ki-yun Yi, Sang-kyu Shim and William D. Clingan founded the World Tang Soo Do Association. Grandmaster Shin's decision to leave the Moo Duk Kwan coincided with Kwan Jang Nim Hwang Kee's release of the new Soo Bahk Do hyungs which also occurred in 1982.

Shin remained the leader of the World Tang Soo Do Association until his death on 9 July 2012, which is composed of over 150,000 members including more than 40 000 black belts and 300 master instructors in 38 countries. He is the author of several books on Tang Soo Do, and was himself featured as a chapter in the 1971 book, “20th century Warriors: Prominent Men in the Oriental Fighting Arts".

In March 2010, the World Tang Soo Do Association's board of directors approved Shin's promotion to 9th degree black belt. In July 2010, Shin was formally promoted to the rank at the association's annual world championships, after 27 years as an 8th degree black belt.

On 9 July 2012, Shin died in his sleep after having health issues in Burlington, NC.

References 

•참고|우리의 무예당수도교본 / http://www.tangsoodo.co.kr

External links 
 The World Tang Soo Do Association
 Jae-chul Shin in the Taekwondo Hall of Fame

1936 births
2012 deaths
People from Seoul
South Korean tang soo do practitioners